William David Gillespie (born 6 August 1934) is a former New Zealand rugby union player. He was a flanker.

He played 23 matches for New Zealand and toured Australia in 1957. He played  one test, the third test against the Wallabies in 1958.

Born in Cromwell, he was educated at Waimate District High School. He did not play rugby until he was 16. His father-in-law was All Black Charlie Oliver.

References

Bibliography
 

1934 births
Living people
New Zealand rugby union players
Gill
Rugby union flankers
Rugby union players from Cromwell, New Zealand